Temistokles Adlawan was a contemporary Cebuano poet and short story writer who often writes with irreverent humor usually associated with Cebuano folk. Some of his writings expresses a greater sensitivity to gender issues.

He is a Bathalan-ong Halad sa Dagang (BATHALAD) member and is active in writers' workshops sponsored by the Women in Literary Arts (WILA) and the Cebuano Studies Center of the University of San Carlos, Cebu City.

Poetry
 Lili (Peep), 1987.
Mamamasol

Short Story
 Ang Gidak-on sa Dagat, 1966.

Awards and recognition
 Posthumous award, Bathalan-ong Halad sa Dagang (Bathalad) Sugbo, August 24, 2019
 Taboan literary award, National Committee on Literary Arts, February 12, 2010
 2nd CCP Literature grant for the short story entitled Tingog sa Kitarang Bagol and Program, Cultural Center of the Philippines, February 28, 1989

References
 www.bisaya.com Visayan Literature page—defunct

Cebuano writers
20th-century Filipino poets
Year of birth missing (living people)
Writers from Cebu
Filipino male poets
20th-century male writers